The 2002 IAAF Grand Prix was the eighteenth edition of the annual global series of one-day track and field competitions organized by the International Association of Athletics Federations (IAAF). The series was divided into four levels: 2002 IAAF Golden League, Grand Prix I and Grand Prix II, and IAAF Permit Meetings. There were seven Golden League meetings, Grand Prix I featured 9 meetings from 5 May to 23 August and Grand Prix II featured 11 meetings from 7 March to 8 September, making a combined total of 27 meetings for the series. An additional 10 IAAF Outdoor Permit Meetings were attached to the circuit.

Compared to the previous season, the meeting schedule remained mostly unchanged, with the exception of the dropping of the Nikaia meeting in Nice and the British Grand Prix II meeting being moved from Gateshead to Sheffield.

Performances on designated events on the circuit earned athletes points which qualified them for entry to the 2002 IAAF Grand Prix Final, held on 14 September in Paris, France. The honour of points leader for the series was shared between three athletes on 92 points: Hicham El Guerrouj and Félix Sánchez topped the men's side while Marion Jones topped the women's side.

Meetings

Points standings

Overall men

Overall women

References

Points standings
2002 GRAND PRIX STANDINGS - Overall Men. IAAF. Retrieved 2019-08-31.
2002 GRAND PRIX STANDINGS - Overall Women. IAAF. Retrieved 2019-08-31.

2002
IAAF Grand Prix